Park Jae-cheol (born October 24, 1975) is a South Korean male curler and curling coach.

Teams

Record as a coach of national teams

References

External links

Living people
1975 births
South Korean male curlers
Pacific-Asian curling champions
Curlers at the 2003 Asian Winter Games
Medalists at the 2003 Asian Winter Games
Asian Games medalists in curling
Asian Games gold medalists for South Korea
Universiade medalists in curling
Universiade bronze medalists for South Korea
Medalists at the 2003 Winter Universiade
South Korean curling coaches
21st-century South Korean people